The Medical Science Monitor is a peer-reviewed general medical journal. It was established in 1995 in Poland and has been published by International Scientific Information based in Melville, New York, U.S.A. since 2002. It was published in both print and online formats until 2012, at which point the journal became online-only. The editor-in-chief is Richard M. Kream. According to the Journal Citation Reports, the journal has a 2019 impact factor of 1.918. Medical Science Monitor is indexed in JCR Clarivate, PubMed, PubMed PMC, EMBASE, and Scopus, which provide abstracts and indexing for publications in established medical journals.

References

External links

General medical journals
Publications established in 1995
Online-only journals
English-language journals